Filipe Pachtmann (born 11 April 2000) is a Brazilian footballer who plays for Zira as a forward.

Career statistics

Club

References

2000 births
Living people
Brazilian footballers
Brazilian expatriate footballers
Association football forwards
FC Lviv players
Zira FK players
Ukrainian Premier League players
Azerbaijan Premier League players
Brazilian expatriate sportspeople in Ukraine
Expatriate footballers in Ukraine
Brazilian expatriate sportspeople in Azerbaijan
Expatriate footballers in Azerbaijan